Gabryel Monteiro de Andrade (born 9 April 1999), known simply as Gabryel, is a Brazilian footballer who currently plays as a midfielder for Kuching City F.C.

Career statistics

Club

Notes

References

1999 births
Living people
Brazilian footballers
Brazilian expatriate footballers
Association football midfielders
Esporte Clube Taubaté players
Atlético Clube Goianiense players
USV Eschen/Mauren players
SC Austria Lustenau players
Austrian Football Bundesliga players
Brazilian expatriate sportspeople in Austria
Expatriate footballers in Austria
Expatriate footballers in Liechtenstein